was a renowned Japanese photographer.

References

Japanese photographers
1891 births
1967 deaths